Léa Drucker (born 23 January 1972) is a French actress.

Early life
Born in Caen, Normandy, she is the niece of television presenter Michel Drucker, and of ex-president of M6 Jean Drucker. Her father Jacques is a medical doctor, and her mother, Martine, an English teacher. She is the cousin of the journalist Marie Drucker, daughter of Jean Drucker. Her paternal grandfather was Jewish.

Having followed courses at the École of the rue Blanche, ENSATT (the École nationale supérieure des arts et techniques du théâtre) in Paris, her career has encompassed both classical theatre pieces like Le Misanthrope, and contemporary plays such as Blanc by Emmanuelle Marie. She has twice been nominated for a Molière Award for best female newcomer, in 2001 for her role in Danny et la grande bleue, and in 2004 for 84 Charing Cross Road.

Filmography

Actress

Director / Writer

Theater

References

External links
 

1972 births
Living people
French people of Romanian-Jewish descent
French people of Austrian-Jewish descent
Lycée Montaigne (Paris) alumni
Actors from Caen
French stage actresses
French film actresses
Chevaliers of the Ordre des Arts et des Lettres
Best Actress César Award winners